The 1934 UCLA Bruins football team was an American football team that represented the University of California, Los Angeles (UCLA) during the 1934 college football season. In their 10th year under head coach William H. Spaulding, the Bruins compiled a 7–3 record (2–3 conference) and finished in sixth place in the Pacific Coast Conference (PCC).

Schedule
The team's schedule consisted of 10 games, 5 in conference, and 5 with teams outside the PCC. While the Bruins went undefeated versus non-conference opponents, they only managed a 2–3 record within the Pacific Coast Conference.

Roster
The following is a partial list of student-athletes on UCLA's football roster during the 1934 season.

Robert Allington
Edward Austin
Robert Barr
Verdi Boyer
Sherman Chavoor
Chuck Cheshire
Joe Denis, Joe 1934
George Dickerson
Mike Frankovich
Fred Funk
Sigfried Funke
Richard Gary
Howard Haradon
John Hastings
R. F. Key
Ransom Livesay
Sinclair Lott
Bob McChesney
Lawrence McConnell
William Murphy
Remington Olmstead
Carl Olson
Charles Pike
Ben Ross
Robert Schroeder
Julian Smith
William Spaulding
Sam Stawisky
Sam Storey
Harry Trotter
Walter Wilton
Wendell Womble

Notes

References

UCLA
UCLA Bruins football seasons
UCLA Bruins football